Julien Rascagnères (20 March 1945 – 19 September 2022) was a French rugby league footballer who played as a hooker and loose forward. He then became a coach and a rugby league referee, officiating at both national and international levels.

Rascagnères refereed matches in the Super League and the New South Wales Rugby League. In 1982, he "refereed in a masterful way […] in front of a stadium packed to the brim with some 40,000 spectators".

Awards
Winner of the Coupe de France Lord Derby with Pia (1975)

References

1945 births
2022 deaths
French rugby league players
French rugby league coaches
XIII Catalan players
Rugby league referees
Sportspeople from Perpignan